Guy Bonnet is an author, composer, and singer, born in Avignon, France in 1945. He wrote the lyrics and composed the music for the French entry in the Eurovision Song Contest 1968 (performed by Isabelle Aubret). In 1970 he participated in the Eurovision song contest for France with "Marie-Blanche" coming 4th out of twelve contestants. In 1983 he represented France in Eurovision again with "Vivre" (finishing eighth). He wrote and composed songs for many artists including Mireille Mathieu, Sylvie Vartan, Franck Fernandel and Massilia Sound System.

He has also written a contemporary pastorale "La Pastorale des enfants de Provence".

External links
 Official website

1945 births
Living people
French composers
French male composers
French male singers
Musicians from Avignon
Eurovision Song Contest entrants for France
Eurovision Song Contest entrants of 1970
Eurovision Song Contest entrants of 1983
French male writers